Neuville is a village on the north shore of the Saint Lawrence River, just west of Quebec City, part of the Portneuf Regional County Municipality, Quebec, Canada. Founded in 1684, it remains picturesque.

The 19th-century artist, Antoine Plamondon, ( 1804–1895) had moved here by 1850 with his mother, brother, and sister. He lived the rest of his life here, more than 40 years.

Neuville has an excellent marina for pleasure sailboats and yachts.

History

In 1653, the area was granted as a seigneurie by Jean de Lauson to Jean Bourdon de Saint-Jean (ca. 1601–1668) for his son Jean-François Bourdon de Dombourg (1647–1690), who was an engineer, surveyor, cartographer, and Attorney General to the sovereign. In 1680, the Dombourg Seigneurie was acquired by Nicolas Dupont de Neuville (1632–1716), thereafter the seigneurie was known as Neuville.

In 1679, the Saint-François-de-Sales Parish was formed; it became a civil parish in 1684. The place was also known as Pointe-aux-Trembles (or Pointe-au-Tremble), in reference to the point on which the church was built, which once was covered with aspen and birch.

The Battle of Pointe-aux-Trembles between France and the United Kingdom was fought nearby on the Saint Lawrence River forcing the French under Chevalier de Lévis to end their siege of Quebec in 1760.

In 1850, the post office opened, identified as Pointe-aux-Trembles. In 1855, the place was incorporated as a Parish Municipality of Saint-François-de-Sales, but renamed to Pointe-aux-Trembles some time after. In 1919, part of its territory separated to form the Village Municipality of Neuville.

On December 18, 1996, the Village Municipality of Neuville and the Parish Municipality of Pointe-aux-Trembles merged again to form the new City of Neuville.

Demographics 

Population trend:

Mother tongue:
 English as first language: 0.9%
 French as first language: 98.1%
 English and French as first language: 0.2%
 Other as first language: 0.8%

Twin village 
The Village of Neuville maintains trade development programs, cultural and educational partnership with the village of Neuville-de-Poitou in France. Its population does not originate from there.

References

External links

Cities and towns in Quebec
Incorporated places in Capitale-Nationale
Designated places in Quebec
1997 establishments in Quebec